Panya Singprayool-Dinmuong (born 17 April 1950) is a former Thai cyclist. He competed at the 1972 Summer Olympics and the 1976 Summer Olympics.

References

External links
 

1950 births
Living people
Panya Singprayool-Dinmuong
Panya Singprayool-Dinmuong
Cyclists at the 1972 Summer Olympics
Cyclists at the 1976 Summer Olympics
Place of birth missing (living people)
Panya Singprayool-Dinmuong